Noe, Noé, Noè or Noë is a masculine given name, a form of Noah, that may refer to the following notable people:
Noé Acosta (born 1983), Spanish football midfielder
Noé Alonzo (born 1983), Mexican basketball player
Noe Balvin (born 1930), Colombian sports shooter
Noé Barrueta (born 1971), Mexican politician
Noë Bloch (1875–1937), Russian-born film producer
Noè Bordignon (1841–1920), Italian painter
Noé Chevrier (1846–1911), Canadian clothier, furrier and political figure 
Noè Cruciani (1963–1996), Italian boxer
Noé Delpech (born 1986), French sailor
Noé Duchaufour-Lawrance (born 1974), French interior architect and designer 
Noë Dussenne (born 1992), Belgian football player
Noé de la Flor Casanova (1904–1986), Mexican lawyer, cantautor, writer, poet and politician 
Noé Gianetti (born 1989), Swiss cyclist
Noé González Alcoba (born 1979), Uruguayan boxer
Noé Hernández (disambiguation), multiple people
Noé Jitrik (born 1928), Argentine literary critic 
Noe Khomeriki (1883–1924), Georgian politician
Noé Kwin (born 1990), Cameroonian football defender
Noé Martín Vázquez (born 1970), Mexican politician
Noé Maya (born 1985), Mexican football midfielder
Noé Medina (born 1943), Ecuadorian cyclist
Noe Muñoz (born 1967), Mexican baseball catcher
Noé Murayama (1930–1997), Mexican actor
Noé Pamarot (born 1979), French football defender
Noe Ramirez (disambiguation), multiple people
Noe Ramishvili (1881–1930), Georgian politician
Noe Rinonos (born 1942), Filipino weightlifter
Noé Roth (born 2000), Swiss freestyle skier
Noé Sissoko (born 1983), Malian football midfielder
 Noe Venable (born 1976), North American folk singer
Noé Willer, French singer
 Noe Zhordania (1868–1953), Georgian politician and journalist

Dutch masculine given names
French masculine given names
Georgian masculine given names
Italian masculine given names
Spanish masculine given names
Masculine given names